Protapanteles is a genus of braconid wasps in the family Braconidae. There are more than 20 described species in Protapanteles, found mainly in the Holarctic.

Species
These 25 species belong to the genus Protapanteles:

 Protapanteles alaskensis 
 Protapanteles anchisiades 
 Protapanteles andromica 
 Protapanteles armeniacus 
 Protapanteles buzurae 
 Protapanteles delitutus 
 Protapanteles endemus 
 Protapanteles enephes 
 Protapanteles hirtariae 
 Protapanteles iapetus 
 Protapanteles immunis 
 Protapanteles incertus 
 Protapanteles lymantriae 
 Protapanteles mandanis 
 Protapanteles neparallelus 
 Protapanteles palabundus 
 Protapanteles paleacritae 
 Protapanteles parallelus 
 Protapanteles phigaliae 
 Protapanteles phlyctaeniae 
 Protapanteles popularis 
 Protapanteles praecipuus 
 Protapanteles querceus 
 Protapanteles santolinae 
 Protapanteles triangulator 
 Protapanteles yunnanensis

References

Further reading

External links

 

Microgastrinae